Rodolfo Díaz can refer to:

 Rodolfo Díaz (basketball) (1918–1993), Mexican Olympic basketball player
 Rodolfo Díaz (Argentine boxer) (born 1936), Argentine Olympic boxer
 Rodolfo Díaz (Philippine boxer) (born 1946), Filipino Olympic boxer